Herman Michael Hickman (October 1, 1911 – April 25, 1958) was an American football player and coach.  He played college football at the University of Tennessee and professionally in the National Football League (NFL) for the Brooklyn Dodgers.  Hickman served as the head football coach at Yale University from 1948 to 1951, compiling a record of 16–17–2.  He later was a television and radio analyst and broadcaster, a writer, and a professional wrestler.

Coach Robert Neyland held Hickman in high regard. "When one (football writer) said Hickman was 'the best guard the South ever produced,' Coach General Bob Neyland snarled, 'Herman Hickman is the greatest guard football has ever known.'"  Hickman was inducted into the College Football Hall of Fame as a player in 1959.

Early years
Hickman was born on October 1, 1911 in Johnson City, Tennessee. Hickman went to Baylor School, where he played fullback.

Playing career

Tennessee
Hickman went to the University of Tennessee, playing for the Tennessee Volunteers football team from 1929 to 1931. Hickman played as a tackle during his sophomore season, but was considered small (5'10" 230 lbs) and was shifted to guard by his junior year.

He was named to Grantland Rice's All-America team in 1931, on the heels of his performance in the New York University (NYU) charity game at Yankee Stadium. NYU once was at the 5-yard line and ran for plays at Hickman, turning the ball over on downs at the 23.  Hickman was also named to the All-Southern team in 1931, joining Vols teammate Gene McEver.

Describing coach Neyland's penchant for defense, Hickman said "If Neyland could score a touchdown against you he had you beat. If he could score two, he had you in a rout."

NFL
Following his time at Tennessee, Hickman played for the National Football League's Brooklyn Dodgers from 1932 to 1934.  He was named an All-Pro at left guard in 1933.

Coaching career
Hickman was an assistant at Wake Forest University, North Carolina State University and the United States Military Academy before earning the head coaching position at Yale University in 1948.  He led the Yale Bulldogs to a 16–17–2 record before resigning in 1951.

Other activities
Hickman had a reputation as a great dinner speaker.  He also participated in television broadcasts of football and in radio and television panel shows.  As a writer, he came to be known as "Poet Laureate of the Little Smokies." He was a staff writer for Sports Illustrated.  Hickman also was a professional wrestler known as "The Tennessee Terror", competing in over 500 matches.

Honors
Handsome Dan VII, the Yale Bulldog mascot was donated to Hickman at age three, but the dog proved to have a bad temper, which suited him better in his next position as a watchdog on a Florida estate.

The Herman Hickman Scholarship was "(e)stablished by UT alumni and friends in 1958 following the death of Herman Hickman... This graduate scholarship is awarded to varsity athletes in the field of their choice.  The recipient currently receives $1,000 per semester."

Head coaching record

References

External links
 
 

1911 births
1958 deaths
People from Johnson City, Tennessee
Players of American football from Tennessee
American football tackles
American football fullbacks
American football guards
Tennessee Volunteers football players
Brooklyn Dodgers (NFL) players
All-Southern college football players
Coaches of American football from Tennessee
Wake Forest Demon Deacons football coaches
NC State Wolfpack football coaches
Army Black Knights football coaches
Yale Bulldogs football coaches
College Football Hall of Fame inductees
College football announcers
National Football League announcers